Irish College Bordeaux– established in 1603, set up under the leadership of Rev. Dermot McCarthy (a priest of the Diocese of Cork), invited by Cardinal François de Sourdis, Archbishop of Bordeaux to set up an Irish College in the city, and affiliated to the University of Bordeaux. McCarthy arrived with forty students from Ireland in November 1603. Pope Paul V, recognised it with a papal bull of the 26 April 1617. Due to an increase in the number of students, in 1618, a number of students were sent to other colleges. Alumni and staff were buried in the Irish Church, St. Eutrope, Bordeaux, which was given to the Irish. Students studied in the Jesuit College. Rector Rev. Dr. Thadee O Mahony developed the College, and recognising the support of Anne of Austria (wife of Louis XIII), they renamed the chapel Saint-Anne-la-Royal. Following endowment in 1654, alumni were granted French naturalisation, which meant a number of alumni stayed and ministered in France. The Irish College in Toulouse (1618-1793) was a sister college also supported by Anne of Austria, it followed the Bordeaux statues until it was constituted with its own statues.

Following the French Revolution students were sent home, and the last rector of the college, Rev. Martin Glynn, was executed by guillotine during the Reign of Terror on 19 July 1794. The college closed with its remaining property (and burses) transferred to the Irish College in Paris. The properties in Bordeaux were sold in 1880.

Rue Mc Carthy is named after the first superior in the college.

The buildings Collège des Irlandais was situated on rue du Hâ, Bordeaux, and the now demolished Chapelle des Irlandais, place Pey Berland.

People Associated with the Irish College Bordeaux
 Rev. Dr. Robert Barry, Bishop of Cork and Cloyne, studied at the college
 Rev. Dr. Dominic Bellew, Bishop of Killala
 Baron Tobias Bourke, studied at the college
 Rev. Patrick Comerford, O.E.S.A., Bishop of Waterford and Lismore studied at the college
 Rev. Andrew Dunne, returned to Ireland, served as President of St. Patrick's College, Maynooth (1803-1807)
 Abbe Henry Essex Edgeworth, studied at the college, before going to Paris
 Rev. Dr. Boetius Egan, Archbishop of Tuam
 Rev. Dr. Patrick Everard, future President of Maynooth College and Archbishop of Cashel, studied at Bordeaux, and served as president and vice-president
 Joseph-Ignace Guillotin, (in)famous for proposing the Guillotine for execution following the french revolution, was a professor of literature at the college
 Rev. Dr. Geoffrey Keating, priest, poet, and historian, was one of the original 40 students who went to Bordeaux with Rev. McCarthy
 Rev. Dr. Robert Lacy, Bishops of Limerick, served as Rector
 Rev. Michael Murphy, Priest in the Ferns diocese, United Irishman killed in the 1798 Rebellion. 
 Rev. Dr. Cornelius O'Keeffe, Bishop of Limerick 
 Rev. Dr. Richard O'Reilly, Archbishop of Armagh, commenced his priestly studies in Bordeaux, before going to Rome
 Rev. Cornelius O’Scanlan served as rector of the college at Bordeaux

See also
 Irish College
 Irish College at Paris

References

Former Catholic seminaries
1605 establishments in France
Irish diaspora in Europe
Irish Colleges on the Continent